The United Synagogue (US) is a union of British Orthodox Jewish synagogues, representing the central Orthodox movement in Judaism. With 62 congregations (including 7 affiliates and 1 associate), comprising 40,000 members, it is the largest synagogue body in Europe. The spiritual leader of the union is the Chief Rabbi of the United Hebrew Congregations of the Commonwealth – a title that bears some formal recognition by the Crown, even though his rabbinical authority is recognised by only slightly more than half of British Jews.

History

The United Synagogue was mandated by an Act of Parliament in 1870, granting formal recognition to a union of three London synagogues forged by Nathan Marcus Adler, who bore the title of Chief Rabbi of the British Empire. Leaders of the organization included Nathan Rothschild, 1st Baron Rothschild, who served as president in 1910.

At the time of its inception, the United Synagogue was the dominant force in Jewish communal and religious organization, though the organization lost some of its hegemony in the 1880s with mass migrations of Jews from Eastern Europe, who brought with them strains of Hassidic Judaism, Reform Judaism and secularism.

In 1887, Jewish community leader Samuel Montagu created the Federation of Synagogues, which worked to unite Orthodox synagogues of Russian and other eastern European migrants living in the slums of East London. Today, the Federation serves 21 synagogues, compared to the United Synagogue's 64. There are also numerous orthodox synagogues in Britain, including Haredi, Chabad, and others, unaffiliated with United Synagogue. In addition, there are congregations of Reform, Masorti and Liberal Jews that are not included in the United Synagogue; so that, today, the organisation represents about 30 percent of all British congregants. Since 1990, central Orthodoxy has declined from 66 percent to 55 percent of total congregants, though this decline has flattened out in recent years.

In 1970, the United Synagogue celebrated its centenary. Events included a special service held at the St. Johns Wood Synagogue, an exhibition of Jewish artefacts held at the Christies Auction Rooms, and a celebratory banquet held at the Dorchester Hotel in the presence of the Queen and the Duke of Edinburgh. This was the first time that the Queen had attended an event held by the Anglo Jewish community, although the Duke of Edinburgh had previously attended the tercentenary commemoration of the return of Jews to England during the period of Oliver Cromwell. Plans are afoot to celebrate 150 years of the US in the year 2020.

Over time, the United Synagogue have closed synagogues in areas of Jewish decline, including many grand cathedral type synagogues, such as Bayswater (to make way for the Westway road), New Cross, Brixton  (one of the very few large United Synagogues south of the river), the Great Synagogue, East London,  Hammersmith, Cricklewood, Egerton Road, Lofting Road and Dalston, while opening new synagogues in areas of Jewish growth, especially in the north western suburbs of London, such as Boreham Wood, Edgware, Barnet and other communities. Seven of the present United Synagogue buildings feature the stained glass windows of the twentieth century artist David Hillman; the largest collection, over 100 windows, is at the St. Johns Wood Synagogue. Some of the closed synagogues (such as Lofting Road or Dalston) were knocked down and replaced by other buildings, some underwent conversion, often to other religious denominations (Hammersmith is now a church), while in one instance – Egerton Road – the synagogue was purchased by one of the local ultra-orthodox groups (the Bobov) and retains a strong Jewish presence.

Much of the previous formality of the United Synagogue, such as the wearing of clerical canonicals by its clergy and waistcoats and top hats by its wardens has now disappeared. The synagogues use modern Hebrew vernacular for its prayers. The Finchley (Kinloss) synagogue, one of the largest of the existing communities, holds an annual religious service to commemorate the Independence Day of the State of Israel, attended by the Chief Rabbi, the Ambassador of Israel and a senior member of Her Majesty's government.

The United Synagogue also owns a number of cemeteries throughout London. Some of these in the East End and West Ham have now closed and are no longer in use. Willesden Jewish Cemetery which includes the graves of many famous historical figures is now the recipient of a heritage grant, while the cemeteries in Waltham Forest and Bushey continue to function. Bushey has recently consecrated a new section which has reached the short list of the Stirling Prize for architecture in for 2018, the first time a cemetery of any kind has been a candidate for this award.

Activities

The United Synagogue provides a number of religious services to the Orthodox community, including:

 The Tribe youth movement, which offers after-school programmes, programmes for toddlers, and trips to Israel for young people.
 Young US – programmes for young adults.
 A Beit Din (the London Beth Din) – a religious court to decide halakhic matters.
 Certification of kashrut under the auspices of the London Beth Din.
 Burial services, including the maintenance of several cemeteries.
 Educational material provided by We Believe in Israel, the grassroots initiative of BICOM.

United Synagogue is an active supporter of Israel.  The organisation sponsors trips to Israel for members and youth, distributes information packages about Israel from its website, and offers courses in Israeli history and politics and Hebrew. In October 2014, it urged its members to lobby members of Parliament to oppose a motion to recognise the State of Palestine.

Activities are financed mostly from charitable donations and gifts, and from dues paid by member synagogues. Some revenues are generated from some £80 million in assets and investments (mostly synagogue buildings).

Jewish community
The United Synagogue is one of 29 members of the Jewish Leadership Council, a British umbrella organisation. It also elects deputies to the Board of Deputies of British Jews.

See also
 List of chief rabbis of the United Kingdom
 History of the Jews in England

References

External links
 

1870 establishments in the United Kingdom
Charities based in London
Jewish charities based in the United Kingdom
Jews and Judaism in the United Kingdom
Orthodox Judaism in London
Religious organizations established in 1870
United